Klaus Riedel (2 August 1907 – 4 August 1944) was a German rocket pioneer. He was involved in many early liquid-fuelled rocket experiments, and eventually worked on the V-2 missile programme at Peenemünde Army Research Center.

History
Riedel was born in Wilhelmshaven, the son of a naval officer. His mother died when he was twelve years old, and his father two years later. The orphaned Riedel was raised by his grandmother in Bernstadt. He went on to study mechanical engineering at the Technical University of Berlin and to work at Löwe. While in Berlin, he attended a public lecture on rocketry by Rudolf Nebel on behalf of Germany's amateur rocket group, the Verein für Raumschiffahrt (VfR - "Spaceflight Society") and joined the group which included others such as Rolf Engel, Rudolf Nebel, Hermann Oberth or Paul Ehmayr, straight away, becoming very active in its efforts to build a working rocket that resulted in the Mirak and Repulsor rockets, providing his family's farm as a testing ground.

After the VfR disbanded in 1933, Riedel refused to join Wernher von Braun in the army's rocket programme and worked for Siemens. He accepted von Braun's offer only in August 1937 after the army paid compensation for earlier rocketry patents owned by him and Rudolf Nebel. Riedel was called "Riedel II", and his initial position in Peenemünde was "Head of the Test Laboratory". From 1941, he was mostly concerned with developing the mobile support equipment for the V-2 and became "Head of Ground Equipment" .

Riedel had been under SD surveillance since the beginning of Nazi Germany in 1933 as he was founding member of the Panterra society and the German league of human rights. A Gestapo report of March 1944 stated that he, Wernher von Braun, and his colleague Helmut Gröttrup were said to have expressed regret at an engineer's house one evening that they were not working on a spaceship and that they felt the war was not going well; this was considered a "defeatist" attitude. A young female dentist who was an SS spy reported their comments. Combined with Himmler's false charges that they were communist sympathizers and had attempted to sabotage the V-2 program, the Gestapo detained them on 21 March 1944, and took them to a Gestapo cell in Stettin (now Szczecin, Poland), where they were held for two weeks without knowing the charges against them. Major-General Walter Dornberger, military head of Peenemünde, and major Hans Georg Klamroth, reprensentative for counterintelligence at Peenemünde, obtained their conditional release so that the V-2 program could continue.

Klaus Riedel was killed in a mysterious car accident on a straight road near to Zinnowitz two days after his thirty-seventh birthday when travelling home from work. He left behind his wife Irmgard Kutwin and an 18 month old daughter.

Dedications 
There is a memorial and small museum dedicated to him in Bernstadt. In 1970, a crater on the moon was named after him and Walter Riedel ("Riedel I", not related to him).

References

German rocket scientists
German spaceflight pioneers
Engineers from Lower Saxony
V-weapons people
1907 births
1944 deaths
Early spaceflight scientists
People from Wilhelmshaven
People from the Province of Hanover
Road incident deaths in Germany
Technical University of Berlin alumni
Peenemünde Army Research Center and Airfield
20th-century German engineers